The Prince William County, Virginia Sheriff's Office was established in 1731 to provide law enforcement and jailers for the County. In 1970, the Board of County Supervisors established the Prince William County Police Department which assumed the primary responsibility for law enforcement. In 1982, the Prince William County Adult Detention Center opened and assumed the duties of jailers. The Sheriff is a constitutional office elected by the Prince William County, City of Manassas and City of Manassas Park to provide certain public safety services.

History
The PWCSO was founded in 1731 and was the sole law enforcement agency for the county until 1970, when most patrol and investigations duties were turned over to the newly-formed Police Department. The agency is now responsible for courtroom security, all jail and prisoner operations, court orders and civil process operations, and fugitive tracking and apprehension.

 the sheriff is Sheriff Glendell Hill (R), who has held the position since 2004. Hill is the county's first Black sheriff.
 
In 2005, the Sheriff's Office achieved re-accreditation for a second time.

In January 2021, after the identity of a deputy was revealed as advocating violence against Supreme Court Chief Justice John Roberts on Parler, the deputy was immediately fired. He had been a deputy for 15 years. He stated his account was hacked, though an anti-fascist activist was able to verify his identity through several sites.

See also

 List of law enforcement agencies in Virginia
 Prince William County Police Department

References

External links
Prince William County Sheriff's Office official website
Prince William County government official website

Prince William County Sheriff
County sheriffs' offices of Virginia